Wacker is an unincorporated community in Carroll County, Illinois, United States. Wacker is located near a railroad line southeast of Savanna and southwest of Mount Carroll.

References

Unincorporated communities in Carroll County, Illinois
Unincorporated communities in Illinois